Weymouth Harbour may refer to:

Weymouth Harbour, Dorset
Weymouth Harbour, Nova Scotia